Hyalarctia tepica is a moth of the family Erebidae first described by Harrison Gray Dyar Jr. in 1914. It is found in Mexico.

References

Phaegopterina
Moths described in 1914